The following is a list of 2018 box office number-one films in Italy.

References 

2018
Italy
2018 in Italian cinema